Jamshidabad (also Romanized as Jamshīdābād; also known as Jamshīdābād-e Gorīrān) is a village in Yusefvand Rural District, in the Central District of Selseleh County, Lorestan Province, Iran. At the 2006 census, its population was 100, in 22 families.

References 

Towns and villages in Selseleh County